The 2005–06 Croatian First Football League (officially known as the Prva HNL Ožujsko for sponsorship reasons) was the fifteenth season of the Croatian First Football League, the national championship for men's association football teams in Croatia, since its establishment in 1992. The season started on 20 July 2005 and ended on 13 May 2006. Hajduk Split were the defending champions, having won their eighteenth championship title the previous season. Dinamo Zagreb won the title, after a win against Osijek on 6 May 2006, which started his eleventh year dominance.

Teams

Stadia and personnel 

 1 On final match day of the season, played on 13 May 2006.

First stage

Rounds 1–22 results

Championship group

Rounds 23–32 results

Relegation group

Rounds 23–32 results

Relegation play-off 

Playoff wasn't needed after the second-placed Croatian Second Football League team, Belišće, failed to secure a license to compete in Prva HNL. Therefore, Međimurje automatically kept their first-league status for the 2006–07 season.

Top goalscorers

See also 
 2005–06 Croatian Second Football League
 2005–06 Croatian Football Cup

External links 
 Season statistics at HRNogomet
 2005–06 in Croatian Football at Rec.Sport.Soccer Statistics Foundation

Croatian Football League seasons
Cro
Prva Hnl, 2005-06